Rifleman is an electro-mechanical arcade game released by Sega Enterprises in 1967, consisting of a target-shooting game with a rifle mounted on the game cabinet. The game had a Wild West theme, and gave the player the results of their shooting on a printed paper card.

References

External links 
 Sega Rifleman on YouTube

Games and sports introduced in 1967
Arcade games